Beat Sneak Bandit  is an iOS puzzle video game developed by Simogo and released on February 16, 2012.

Reception

The game has a rating of 92/100 on Metacritic based on 19 critic reviews.

Gamezebo said "A true work of art, in so many ways. It's smart. It's challenging. It's gorgeous. But most importantly, it's fun - dizzying, dreamy, and delightful fun." Slidetoplay wrote "Beat Sneak Bandit is quite unlike any other rhythm game on the market." AppSpy said "The sort of game that comes from a mad fever dream that mixes games like Trilby: The Art of Theft and Dance Dance Revolution... the end result is something that carefully balances its puzzles with a rhythm based system, sucking you right in and not letting go until you're done." TouchArcade said "It's rare to find a game that does something so original so well, with every element of gameplay and design falling into place. Simogo has pulled it off with Beat Sneak Bandit. In my books it's a must buy, and such a shame it would be to miss out." Touchgen said "Like many success stories on the AppStore, it's the simplicity that makes Beat Sneak Bandit shine. On the face of it, it looks like any other platformer, with elements from classics such as Donkey Kong, Manic Miner and Mario. But by injecting it all with rhythm, Simogo have created something truly unique." GamesMaster described the game as "A wonderful little puzzler that will charm and entertain you effortlessly". IGN said "Polished, challenging, wholly original and a heck of a lot of fun. It's a great example of how presentation, control and design can come together to create a cohesive and extremely fun package. Don't miss it! " Edge said "There's a remarkable consistency to the design even as the levels gets steadily bolder until, after hovering vacuums, teleporters, and levers that freeze time, Simogo throws in a climactic boss battle that is as nerve-wracking as it is joyous." AppSmile wrote "With dead-simple controls, outstanding level design, and engaging graphics and music, Beat Sneak Bandit fires on all cylinders to provide one of the more uniquely stunning experiences we've had with an iOS title." Pocket Gamer said "It's an unlikely mix for sure, but Beat Sneak Bandit's smart blend of puzzling and beat-matching proves to be an ingeniously crafted delight."

AppSafari wrote "The only limitation I see is that because the music is so crucial to gameplay, you can't play with the volume muted. Still, I think that is a small limitation of the application, and the music alone makes for immersive puzzle gameplay." 148Apps wrote "The controls could use some fine-tuning and I found being unable to 180 without hitting a barrier frustrating, even while understanding that is essential to the puzzle component. Nonetheless, Beat Sneak Bandit has style, well-blended elements from many popular gaming genres, and a unique musical aspect that make for a innovative and pulsating good time." VideoGamer.com said "It is disarmingly addictive, and by far the most original game to hit the App Store in ages. Even if you're a bit rubbish at it, it's impossible not to fall in love with this funky little number." Gamer.nl wrote "Puzzlegames with musical elements aren't anything new, but Beat Sneak Bandit does feel the part. The game has a delightful graphical style and easy to learn but hard to master gameplay."

References

2012 video games
IOS games
IOS-only games
Puzzle video games
Simogo games
Video games developed in Sweden
Single-player video games
Independent Games Festival winners